Boody is an unincorporated community and census-designated place (CDP) in Macon County, Illinois, United States. As of the 2020 census, Boody had a population of 232, down from 276 in 2010. Boody has a post office with ZIP code 62514.

The community was named after Col William H Boody.

Geography

The community is drained to the southwest by tributaries of Spring Creek, a tributary of west-flowing Mosquito Creek and part of the Sangamon River watershed.

Community

Boody has a used car dealership (Carl's Auto Sales established in 1941), and a saw mill (Curry Sawmill). Larry Warren, a longtime resident of Boody, donated his estate to be turned into a park after he died in 2003. Warren Park is located off Route 48 in the center of Boody.

In 1998, Joe Crump founded the Boody Water Company. The company worked to provide city water to all of the residents of the town. In 2007, the project was complete, and city water was piped into the town from Macon. Boody now has its own water tower, located on the south end of the town on Route 48.

The old Boody Elementary School, previously part of the Blue Mound School district, is currently for sale as a five bedroom home. Boody also has an old, non-functioning grain elevator in the center of town that is currently listed for sale at $125,000.

Demographics

Notable people 
Lauren Doyle, rugby sevens player who competed for the United States at the 2016 Summer Olympics

References

Census-designated places in Macon County, Illinois
Census-designated places in Illinois
Unincorporated communities in Illinois
Populated places established in 1998
Unincorporated communities in Macon County, Illinois